The Hochfirst or Hoher First is a mountain in the main chain (Gurgler Kamm or "Gurgl Ridge") of the Ötztal Alps.

Mountains of Tyrol (state)
Mountains of South Tyrol
Mountains of the Alps
Alpine three-thousanders
Ötztal Alps
Austria–Italy border
International mountains of Europe